Moustafa Belhmira (born 12 August 1950) is a Moroccan judoka. He competed in the men's lightweight event at the 1972 Summer Olympics.

References

External links
 

1950 births
Living people
Moroccan male judoka
Olympic judoka of Morocco
Judoka at the 1972 Summer Olympics
Place of birth missing (living people)
20th-century Moroccan people
21st-century Moroccan people